Gorki Águila (born November 11, 1968 in Havana) is a Cuban rock musician, who has publicly criticized communism. He is the leader of the punk rock band Porno para Ricardo.

Águila lives with his father in a small apartment in Marianao, where he also has been recording his songs with the band since they were forbidden to have concerts. His mother and sister live in Mexico. Águila has an 11-year-old daughter, Gabriela.

Initially, his band was well received by the Cuban authorities, being even featured on television, but as his lyrics became bolder, he was banned from performing in public, so the songs were put on the internet with the help of a friend from abroad.

In 2003, Águila was jailed on drug charges after a policewoman posed as a fan and asked him for amphetamines, after which he gave her two pills. He argues this was entrapment and an attempt to silence him. After serving 4 and a half years in Cuba's 5½ Kilo Prison, Aguila became an even more outspoken critic of the Cuban government, his lyrics growing more political. In an interview with CNN in 2007, Aguila said that "Communism is a failure. A total failure. Please. Leftists of the world -- improve your capitalism."  In an interview with exiled Cuban anarchists, PPR described anarchism as being "very seductive."

In 2007, Gorki featured in the documentary Cuba RebelioN, a film by Alessio Cuomo and Sander de Nooij about Cuban underground rock musicians who rebel against the Castro regime. It shows the painful reality of musicians who are not allowed to express themselves publicly, but are nevertheless willing to put their freedom at risk by playing their music.

In August 2008, Águila was arrested by the Cuban police with the charge of "dangerousness", which allows them to detain people whom they think they are likely to commit crimes. The charge carries a penalty of one up to four years in prison. Signs of a "dangerousness state" are habitual drunkness and anti-social behaviour. He was eventually ordered to pay a $30 fine for the lesser offence of public disorder, after prosecutors dropped the more serious charge.

He has stated in an interview in 2008: "Capitalism is very problematic, as are Communism and socialism. . . . [F]or me, defending my anti-Castro ideas doesn’t mean an implicit defence of capitalism."

See also
 Censorship in Cuba
 Cuban dissident movement

References

1968 births
Living people
Opposition to Fidel Castro
Cuban anti-communists
20th-century Cuban male musicians
21st-century Cuban male musicians